Kajo may refer to:

People 
 Markus Kajo, Finnish reporter, screenwriter and TV show host
 Ali Kajo, Kenyan footballer
 Kajo Baldisimo, Filipino comic book artist

Other uses 
 Kajō, a Japanese era (1106–1108)
 Kashō, or Kajo, a Japanese era (848–851)
 KAJO, an American radio station
 Corona Municipal Airport, ICAO code: KAJO, an airport in the United States

See also 
 Kayo (disambiguation)
 Kaio (disambiguation)